The White Shorthaired goat is a dairy  breed from the Czech Republic. It is the result of selective breeding of native Czech landrace goats crossed with Swiss Saanen goats.

Sources

White Shorthaired Goat

Goat breeds
Dairy goat breeds
Goat breeds originating in the Czech Republic